Derek Colin Chamberlain (6 January 1933 – 2013) was an English professional footballer who played in the Football League for Mansfield Town.

References

1933 births
2013 deaths
English footballers
Association football defenders
English Football League players
Aston Villa F.C. players
Mansfield Town F.C. players
York City F.C. players